For the Electric Light Orchestra-style band by Boston musician Bleu and collaborators, see LEO (band)

Leo is an American alternative rock band formed by Ian Eddy and Brandon Zano in Cleveland, Ohio in 2001. Eddy explained the name of the band by stating "I'm an Aries, and Leo is supposed to be my perfectly matched partner. I named the band Leo because music is my perfect partner." Leo originally consisted of Eddy on guitar and lead vocals, drummer Stephen Nicholson, lead guitarist Brandon Zano, and bassist Dan Griffith. The band recorded several tracks in 2002 and began distributing demo CDs at live shows. Stephen Nichols left the band in 2004, and he was replaced on drums by Chad Szeliga, formerly of the Cleveland based band Switched.

Eddy relocated the band from Cleveland to St. Peters, Missouri in late 2004. As a result of the move, the band experienced changes in their line-up. Bassist Rek Mohr and guitarist Brandon Zano moved to St. Peters with Eddy. Drummer Chad Szeliga and bassist Dan Griffith left the band and remained in Ohio. Szeliga eventually went on to join Breaking Benjamin on drums in 2005. Zano decided to leave Leo and return to Ohio about a month after relocating to the St. Louis area. Zano then formed the popular punk band, Dozen Dead Roses with Griffith and ex-Signoffs guitarist Tim Long and drummer Kris Monroe. In order to fill the empty slots in Leo, Eddy convinced guitarist Michael Roberts and drummer Mark Grabowski from the Ohio based band Ivet to move to Missouri to join Leo. Leo began recording their debut album at their home studio in 2006. Chad Szeliga had already recorded drums for several tracks before joining Breaking Benjamin in 2005, and he gave his permission to use the drum work on Leo's debut album. The band released their debut album Nightmares in 2007 on the Dream Makers Music label.

Leo has opened for Breaking Benjamin, the Burden Brothers, Sick Puppies, and Greenwheel. The band also earned a spot in the 2007 Pointfest music festival, opening for Breaking Benjamin, Three Days Grace, and Seether.

Ian Eddy has now moved on to releasing solo work, although Roberts, Mohr, and Grabowski continue to support Eddy on guitar, bass, and drums for some tracks. Rek Mohr moved on to join that band Hurt in May 2008. Ian Eddy released The Storm EP in July 2010. Roberts, Mohr, and Grabowski performed in two of the six tracks on the EP. Also joining Eddy in recording The Storm, were Evan Johns on drums, David Arato on strings, and Nathan Hershey on piano.

In 2013, Ian Eddy reformed Leo with Copperview members Pat Gibson and Dave Kopp, and St. Louis drummer Alex Rivera.

References

Alternative rock groups from Missouri
St. Peters, Missouri
Musical groups from Cleveland